This is a list of current and former companies operating in, or based in, Hayward, California. Significant local divisions of national and international companies are included, as are local businesses. Former companies that have closed, been acquired by other companies, or moved are also listed. Other economically or culturally important institutions, such as shopping malls, colleges, and nonprofit organizations, are included.

Retail

Southland Mall is the largest shopping center in Hayward. It houses the anchor department stores Sears, Kohl's and Macy's, and other retailers. In addition to a Target store at the Skywest Commons mall, the city's major retailers include Home Depot and Office Depot. A Costco Business Center is located there.

Manufacturing

Hayward has a large number of manufacturing businesses and corporate headquarters, including high-tech companies, and is considered part of a northern extension of Silicon Valley. (Companies manufacturing in Hayward are in bold text.)
Alphabet Energy, cofounded in 2009 by Matthew L. Scullin and Peidong Yang, manufacturer of thermoelectric devices based on tetrahedrite
Andersen Bakery, American branch of the Japan-based business Takaki Bakery
Annabelle Candy, makers of Abba-Zaba bars, moved to Hayward in 1965
Anthera Pharmaceuticals
Azuma Foods International, seafood packager; a division of Azuma Foods, Mie, Japan, operates its American headquarters and factory in Hayward

Berkeley Farms, opened a state-of-the-art processing plant in Hayward in 1998
Bianchi Bicycles, American branch
Black Garlic, founded by Korean Scott Kim, the creator and exclusive distributor in America for black garlic
Christensen Controllers, makers of the Sonic Palette
Columbus Salame, opened a new $31 million processing facility in 2011, replacing their former facility in South San Francisco
Dust Networks, wireless sensor network manufacturer 

Gillig Corporation, manufacturer of low floor transit buses 
Illumina, operates a research and development center, formerly Solexa
Impax Laboratories, drug manufacturer; headquarters and a 1.2 billion unit/year production facility
Injex Industries (see 2010 top employers)
Intarcia Therapeutics
Kobe Steel, Japanese; operates a subsidiary, Kobe Precision
Kosan Biosciences, founded in Hayward in 1995
Manheim San Francisco Bay, a division of Manheim Auctions
Marelich Mechanical, HVAC company, a subsidiary of Emcor
Mendel Biotechnology, founded in Hayward in 1997
Motiv Power Systems, manufacturer of all-electric powertrains that can be dropped into diesel truck chassis
Mountain Mike's Pizza, restaurant chain, headquarters
Nakagawa Manufacturing USA, a division of Nakagawa Manufacturing, Saitama, Japan, operates a thermal paper facility
PepsiCo, operates its San Francisco Bay production and distribution center
Plastikon, a plastics manufacturer with locations worldwide; based in Hayward and is its 10th largest employer in Hayward
Recording King, guitar and banjo designers
Rocket Dog, women's shoe designers
Sakura Color Products of America, the American division of Sakura Color Products Corporation
 Shasta, soft drink company, headquarters

Simms' Custom Cycles, founded by legendary custom motorcycle builder Ron Simms
Simple Wave, the creator of the Calibowl spill free bowl
Sugar Bowl Bakery, founded in 1984 in San Francisco, facilities consolidated in Hayward from locations in Hayward and San Francisco
Ultra Clean Technology, has operated its headquarters, and one of its manufacturing plants, out of Hayward since 2008, having moved there from Palo Alto
US Boba Company, first U.S. company to make bubble tea tapioca balls

Other
Ace Hardware, owned by news reporter Jim Wieder; is in an historic building, built in 1900, where boxer Max Baer once trained
All Pro Wrestling, wrestling venue
Buffalo Bill's Brewery, one of the first brewpubs in California since Prohibition
California State University, East Bay, operates its main campus in Hayward
Chabot College, junior college
Chapel of the Chimes, cemetery and funeral home
Elite Translingo, A translation and localization services company which specializes in technical translation
Green Shutter Hotel, historic building, until 2017 was operated as a residential hotel, in addition to having retail businesses
 La Piñata, first location opened in Hayward in 1983; is now a local chain of seven restaurants, which produces its own brand of tequila in Ameca, Jalisco, Mexico
Russell City Energy Center, a 429 megawatt natural gas fired power plant; went online in 2013
St. Rose Hospital

Nonprofits
Downtown Streets Team
Horizon Services

Top employers

2014
According to the city's 2014 Comprehensive Annual Financial Report, the top employers in the city, representing 6.5% of total city employment, were:

2013
According to the city's 2013 Comprehensive Annual Financial Report, the top employers in the city, representing 8.2% of total city employment, were:

2012
According to the city's 2012 Comprehensive Annual Financial Report, the top employers in the city, representing 6.8% of total city employment, were:

2011
According to the city's 2011 Comprehensive Annual Financial Report, the top employers in the city, representing 8% of total city employment, were:

2010
According to the city's 2010 Comprehensive Annual Financial Report, the top employers in the city that year, representing 7% of total city employment, were:

2009
According to the City's 2009 Comprehensive Annual Financial Report, the top employers in the city that year were:

† indicates employers wholly located or headquartered in Hayward

Two businesses which had significant employment in fiscal year 2000–2001, Mervyns (2,000), and Pacific Bell (940), no longer operate in Hayward.

Former businesses

Hunt Brothers Cannery
The economy of Hayward in the first half of the twentieth century was based largely on the Hunt Brothers Cannery. It was opened in Hayward in 1895 by brothers William and Joseph Hunt, who were fruit packers originally from Sebastopol, California. The Hunts initially packed local fruit, including cherries, peaches, and apricots, then added tomatoes, which became the mainstay of their business. At its height in the 1960s and 1970s, Hunt's operated three canneries in Hayward, at A, B, and C Streets; an adjacent can-making company; a pickling factory; and a glass manufacturing plant. From the 1890s until its closure in 1981, Hunt's employed a large percentage of the local population. The air around Hayward was permeated by the smell of tomatoes for three months of each year, during the canning season. The canneries closed in 1981, as there were no longer enough produce fields or fruit orchards near the cannery to make it economically viable. Much of the production was moved to the Sacramento Valley. The location of the former canneries is marked by a historic water tower with the Hayward logo.  A housing development now occupies much of the former cannery site.

Other former businesses
Much of the Bay coastal territory of Hayward was turned into salt ponds, with Oliver Salt and Leslie Salt operating there. Much of this land has in recent years been returned to salt marshes. A 1983 image of the ponds appears on a 2012 US postage stamp. 

AirLink Communications, wireless service provider; operated in Hayward until its 2007 acquisition by Sierra Wireless 
Ball Corporation, operated an aluminum can factory until 1998; formerly owned by Reynolds Metals 
Banchero's, large Italian restaurant, operated from 1948 to 2012 
Chaosium, role-playing game publisher, now based in Ann Arbor, Michigan
ComputerLand, former franchise computer retailer
Etec Systems, Inc., operated in Hayward from 1970 until 2005, when it was closed by its parent company 
 Everest College campus, closed by 2015, as part of the Corinthian Colleges collapse
 Franklin Ophthalmic Instruments
Hayward Daily Review, formerly published by the Alameda Newspaper Group, now consolidated into the East Bay Tribune
 Heald College campus, closed by 2015, as part of the Corinthian Colleges collapse
The Holiday Bowl bowling alley, operated in south Hayward for 47 years; closed in 2005 
Kaiser Permanente, operated a Kaiser Permanente Medical Center; closed when the Medical Center in neighboring San Leandro was completed
 Land and Liberty, anarchist periodical; published in Hayward from 1914 to 1915
Mack Truck Company, manufactured trucks through the 1970s
MDL Information Systems, founded in 1978; acquired by Symyx Technologies in 2007
Mervyns, department store chain; was headquartered in Hayward until declaring bankruptcy in 2008
Nellcor, founded in 1981, now a brand of pulse oximetry systems sold by Covidien
Osborne Computer Corporation, operated a manufacturing facility in the 1980s 
Qume, daisy wheel printer manufacturer 
Star Reach, comic book publisher from the 1970s; run by Mike Friedrich
TML Studios, recording studio owned by Tesla band member Troy Luccketta, where albums by Loudness were recorded
The Valle Vista roller skating rink, operated for 44 years in south Hayward; closed in 2003

References

See also
List of companies based in the San Francisco Bay Area

Hayward
 
Hayward